The Shanghai–Xi'an high-speed train are high-speed train services between Shanghai and Xi'an, an ancient capital of China and the capital of Shaanxi Province. Trains are operated by CR Shanghai, CR Xi'an and CR Zhengzhou.

History
The high-speed train services between Shanghai and Xi'an was commenced on 10 September 2016, with the inauguration of the Zhengzhou–Xuzhou HSR (part of Xuzhou–Lanzhou HSR). 

On December 30, 2019, two new trains between Shanghai and Xi'an are started to operation, which via Beijing–Shanghai HSR, Hefei–Nanjing passenger railway, Shangqiu–Hangzhou HSR and Xuzhou–Lanzhou HSR.

Operations

The G360/361 and G362/359 trains offer faster services with only three intermediate stops (and ), and are called as "benchmark trains". Other trains are services with more stops and longer travelling time.

According to the train numbering rules of China Railway, odd numbers are for south or west bound trains and even numbers are for north or east bound trains. The trains from Shanghai to Xi'an travel northbound on Beijing–Shanghai HSR and westbound on Xuzhou–Lanzhou HSR, and the trains from Xi'an to Shanghai travel eastbound on Xuzhou–Lanzhou HSR and southbound on Beijing–Shanghai HSR. Therefore, all the train services on this route have 2 train numbers for the same service.

● : stop at the station
 | : pass the station
  : Benchmark train

Shanghai → Xi'an
Via Xuzhou East

Via Hefei

Xi'an → Shanghai
Via Xuzhou East

Via Hefei

Rolling stocks
The services are operated by CRH380B trainsets.

Other services
The services between Shanghai and Lanzhou (G1972/1969 and G1970/1971), Chongqing (G1974/1975 and G1976/1973) also provide services between Shanghai and Xi'an.

References

China Railway passenger services
Passenger rail transport in China
Railway services introduced in 2016